Dupucharopa is a genus of small, air-breathing land snails, terrestrial gastropod mollusks in the family Charopidae.

Distribution
This genus occurs in Western Australia

Species
Species in the genus Dupucharopa include:
 Dupucharopa millestriata (Smith, 1874)

References

  Iredale, T. 1939. A review of the land Mollusca of Western Australia. Journal of the Royal Society of Western Australia 25: 1-88

 
Charopidae
Gastropods of Australia
Taxonomy articles created by Polbot